The Zhenotdel, the women's department of the Central Committee of the All-Russian Communist Party (Bolsheviks), was the section of the Russian Communist party devoted to women's affairs in the 1920s. It gave women in the Russian Revolution new opportunities until it was dissolved in 1930.

History
The Zhenotdel was established by two Russian feminist revolutionaries, Alexandra Kollontai and Inessa Armand, in 1919. It was devoted to improving the conditions of women's lives throughout the Soviet Union, fighting illiteracy, and educating women about the new marriage, education, and working laws put in place by the Communist Party of the Soviet Union. In Soviet Central Asia, the Zhenotdel also spearheaded efforts to improve the lives of Muslim women through literacy and educational campaigns, and through "de-veiling" campaigns.

The Zhenotdel persuaded the Bolsheviks to legalise abortion in Russia, the first country to do so, in November 1920. This was the first time in history that women had the right to free abortions in state hospitals.

The leaders of the Zhenotdel were committed communists, and worked as part of the Soviet state apparatus. Historian Elizabeth Wood has argued that the organization took an active interest in women's problems, and initially served as a conduit for women's issues from the people to the state. The Zhenotdel was shut down by Stalin as he was establishing his power in 1930, he belived that women's issues in the Soviet Union had been "solved" by the eradication of private property and the nationalization of the means of production. After the Zhenotdel was disbanded many of the gendered social rules that had been fought aginst returned.

Leaders 
Zhenotdel had five leaders during its 11 years of existence:
 1919−1920: Inessa Armand
 1920−1921: Alexandra Kollontai
 1922−1924: Sofia Smidovic
 1924−1925: Klavdiya Nikolayeva
 1925−1930: Aleksandra Artyukhina

See also
 Zhensovety
 Kommunistka
 Women in the Russian Revolution
 Communist Women's International
 Polina Zhemchuzhina
 Antifascist Committee of Soviet Women

References

Further reading
 Clements, B. E. (1992). The Utopianism of the Zhenotdel. Slavic Review, 51(3), pp. 485-496. .
 Cox, J. (2019). The Women's Revolution: Russia 1905–1917. Chicago, IL: Haymarket Books.
 Hayden, C. (1976). The Zhenotdel and the Bolshevik Party. Russian History, 3(2), pp.150-173.
 Massell, G. J. (1974). The Surrogate Proletariat: Moslem Women and Revolutionary Strategies in Soviet Central Asia, 1919-1929. Princeton, NJ: Princeton University Press.
 Ruthchild, R. G. (2010). Equality and Revolution: Women's Rights in the Russian Empire, 1905-1917. Pittsburgh, PA: University of Pittsburgh Press.
 ———. (2010) Women's Suffrage and Revolution in the Russian Empire, 1905-1917. In Offen, K. (Ed.). Globalizing Feminisms, 1789-1945. New York, NY: Routledge. pp. 257-274.
 Stites, R. (1976). Zhenotdel: Bolshevism and Russian Women, 1917-1930. Russian History, 3(2), pp. 174-193.
 Stites, R. (1978). The Women's Liberation Movement in Russia: Feminism, Nihilism, and Bolshevism, 1860-1930. Princeton, NJ: Princeton University Press.
 Wood, E. (1997). The Baba and the Comrade Gender and Politics in Revolutionary Russia. Bloomington, IN: Indiana University Press.

External links 
 Early Bolshevik Work Among Women of the Soviet East (details the work of Zhenotdel activists)

Feminism in the Soviet Union
Organizations established in 1919
Organizations established in 1920
Bodies of the Communist Party of the Soviet Union
Feminist organizations in Russia
Women's wings of communist parties
Women's rights in the Soviet Union